John Francis Kenyon (born 2 December 1953) is an English former footballer who played for Blackburn Rovers in the early 1970s as a forward.

Career
John Francis Kenyon, a talented forward known for his speed and eye for goal. In 1970, Kenyon began his football career with Great Harwood Town. While at Great Harwood, Kenyon became one of the stars of the club which generated interest from Arsenal, Crystal Palace and Blackburn Rovers.

At age 18, Kenyon signed with the Rovers under coach Ken Furphy. In 1975, Kenyon's goal against Brighton & Hove Albion gave the Rovers the Third Division championship in 1975.  Kenyon spent some time with Liverpool F.C. scoring a hat trick on his debut before returning to Blackburn Rovers.

After disagreements with manager Jim Smith, Kenyon joined Wigan Athletic, scoring two goals for the club in 13 Northern Premier League appearances. In 1977, he moved again to Runcorn,  were he became another one of the fans favoured players supporting the team through its FA Cup qualifying campaign.

References

External links
 

Runcorn Linnets F.C. players
Blackburn Rovers F.C. players
Great Harwood F.C. players
Wigan Athletic F.C. players
1953 births
Living people
English footballers
Association football forwards